Abdul Hadi Shekaib (born 27 April 1940 in Kabul) is a former Afghanistan athlete, who competed at the 1960 Summer Olympic Games in the Men's 100m and the Men's 4 × 100 m Relay, he failed to advance in either.

References

Athletes (track and field) at the 1960 Summer Olympics
Olympic athletes of Afghanistan
1940 births
Afghan male sprinters
Living people
Sportspeople from Kabul